Rope-soled shoes have soles (and possibly other parts) made from rope or rope fibres.  They were formerly a cheap, disposable, hand-made item.  However, the widely made espadrille comes in many styles and can include expensive fashion items.

Espadrille 

Espadrilles are traditional rope-soled shoes originating in the Basque Country, Catalonia and Aragon regions of Spain. They typically have a sandal-like form with woven straps or else a canvas upper.  They were originally made from woven esparto (hence the name), but modern mass-produced shoes are more commonly made from the cheaper jute giving the modern shoe a distinctive bright white colour.  Espadrilles are now made in many countries including Spain, France, Italy, and many South American countries. Typically nowadays though, manufacturers import pre-made rope soles from Bangladesh, a major source of jute, with the finishing and styling taking place in the local country.

Bast shoe 

Bast shoes are made from bast fibres.  They were traditional shoes of the peoples of the taiga forests of northern Europe and Russia.  Bast shoes were an item worn by the rural poor; leather was preferred in cities.  Bast shoes were time-consuming to make.  The bark from three or four saplings was soaked in a press for a long period.  Despite this, the shoes were somewhat disposable, only lasting a week or so.  Bast shoes were used until the mid-twentieth century.  They did not always have a rope-like sole as in the picture.  Perhaps more commonly they were crudely woven strips of bark.

Waraji 

Waraji are traditional Japanese shoes made from rope fibres (usually rice straw).  They are cheap, disposable footwear not expected to last more than a day.

Maritime use 
Disposable working shoes very similar to espadrilles were at one time worn by sailors, particularly in hot regions.  They were hand made on board ship by each sailor individually.  The soles and straps were made by the plaiting technique of sennit using rope yarns.  Rope and canvas were materials readily available on sailing ships.  The practice was definitely still current in the 1940s and may have continued into the 1960s in some places.

References 

Shoes
Sandals
Folk footwear